is one of the international athletic games, which takes place every April at Hiroshima Big Arch stadium in Hiroshima, Japan.

In 1967, this game began to commemorate the feat of Mikio Oda, a native of Hiroshima and the first Japanese Olympic gold medalist. It is one of the major track and field meets in Japan called Japan Grand Prix, and qualifying trials for World Championships and Summer Olympic Games have been held.

Athletics competitions in Japan
Sports competitions in Hiroshima